The 14th ACTRA Awards were presented on April 3, 1985, to honour achievements in Canadian television and radio broadcasting in 1984. The ceremony was hosted by Roger Abbott and Joyce Davidson.

Television

Radio

Journalism and special awards

References

1985 in Canadian television
1985 television awards
ACTRA Awards